KUPL (98.7 FM) is a commercial radio station in Portland, Oregon. The station is owned by Alpha Media and airs a country music radio format, known as "98.7 The Bull."

KUPL's studios and offices are located in Downtown Portland on SW 5th Avenue. The transmitter is in Portland's West Hills, on SW Barnes Road.

History

KPOJ-FM/KPOK-FM
On June 6, 1948, the station signed on as KPOJ-FM at 98.7 MHz. It was owned and operated by The Oregon Journal. It was powered at 44,000 watts and mostly simulcast co-owned AM 1330 KPOJ, a network affiliate of the Mutual Broadcasting System and the Don Lee Network.

It moved one spot lower on the FM dial, to 98.5 MHz, on March 27, 1964. On August 15, 1968, KPOJ-FM changed its call sign to KPOK-FM. It played oldies and called itself "The Golden Sound." On June 18, 1973, KPOK-FM changed its format from oldies to beautiful music as "98-FM." On July 11, 1973, the call letters switched to KUPL-FM while AM 1330 aired country music, also using the KUPL call sign. The beautiful music on 98.5 lasted more than a decade.

Switch to Country
In 1982, KUPL-AM-FM were acquired by the Scripps Howard Broadcasting. On March 16, 1984, after 10 years as an easy listening station, KUPL-FM dropped the format and joined its AM counterpart as a country music station. KUPL-AM had also previously broadcast easy-listening, continuing with the format as a "Music of Your Life" affiliate since 1981. The moniker was "K98, Continuous Hit Country." Later the station would be known as "Couple 98" by pronouncing the call letters KUPL.

In 1996, the stations changed hands again, now owned by American Radio Systems. On September 4, 1997, KUPL-FM moved back from 98.5 MHz to 98.7 MHz, its original frequency.

Over the course of the next decade the station would rebrand various times including 98.7 KUPL and New Country 98-7 KUPL. In 1995, the AM station was sold for $2 million to Crawford Broadcasting, who switched it to a Christian radio format as KKPZ. In 1998, KUPL-FM was acquired by CBS Radio.

Sale to Alpha Media
In August 2009, CBS sold its Portland cluster to newly formed Alpha Media. Radio vet Scott Mahalick was hired to program KUPL-FM. On September 16, 2010, the "-FM" suffix was removed from the station's callsign.

In March 2011, the station began using the slogan "98-7 KUPL, #1 For The Most New Country." On January 10, 2013 at midnight, the station dropped the "98-7 KUPL" branding for "98-7 The Bull." It only uses the actual callsign during legal station identifications.

See also
List of radio stations in Oregon

References

External links

UPL
Country radio stations in the United States
Radio stations established in 1948
1948 establishments in Oregon
Alpha Media radio stations